Birmingham Steel Magnolias was a women's American football team based in Birmingham, Alabama. The team played in the Central Conference of the professional Women's Football Association in the 2002–03 season. The team finished the regular season with a 5–5 record but lost the conference championship to the Indianapolis Vipers.

The Steel Magnolias' home games were played at Lawson Field. The owner was Alta Svoboda.

Schedule
Key:

Regular season

Post-season

References

External links
 BirminghamProSports.com

American football teams in Alabama
American football teams in Birmingham, Alabama
2002 establishments in Alabama
2003 disestablishments in Alabama
American football teams established in 2002
American football teams disestablished in 2003
Jefferson County, Alabama
Women's sports in Alabama